Vahe Tadevosyan (born 17 October 1983, in Yerevan, Soviet Union) is an Armenian football striker. He has made several appearances for the Armenian U-21 side.

External links
 Profile at Football-Lineups.com

1983 births
Living people
Footballers from Yerevan
Armenian footballers
Armenian expatriate footballers
FC Ararat Yerevan players
FC Urartu players
FC Aarau players
Armenian Premier League players
Swiss Super League players
Expatriate footballers in Switzerland
Association football forwards